Reed's rules are a set of guidelines developed by Joseph O. Reed in interpretation of pediatric radiology.

Reed's rules
Reed's rules are as follows:
On every chest film, read the abdominal portion as you would read an abdominal film. 
Knowledge of anatomy is the key to correct radiographic diagnosis.
The airway should be visible on all normal chest films.
A mass must be seen in two planes.
An esophagram must be done on any child with unexplained respiratory disease.
In unilateral hyperexpansion of the lungs, you must see how the air moves. Mediastinal position is critical to this determination.
Always review all old films to assess new ones properly. Subtle findings can be missed easily when a single previous examination is reviewed.
The abdominal examination should include a minimum of three views—supine, prone and erect.
On every abdominal examination, evaluate the chest as if you were looking at a chest film.
In obstruction of the lumen, there should be proximal distention.
During intravenous urography, keep taking films as long as you are getting needed information.
Try to find the effects of the mass on adjacent organs on each abdominal film. Draw the mass, if necessary.
After you have defined the mass, find the center of the lesion. Then consider all structures, gross and microscopic, near the center of the lesion as possible sources of the mass. Think skin to skin.
The periosteum is not normally seen.
When viewing an extremity, try to imagine the appearance of the patient. An excellent example is bowed legs or knock knees.

References

Radiology
Rules